Swanks Run is a tributary of West Branch Fishing Creek in Sullivan County, Pennsylvania, in the United States. The stream is considered to be Class A Wild Trout Waters for its entire length. Boulder Colluvium, alluvium, and bedrock consisting of sandstone and shale can be found in the vicinity of the stream. It is on Pennsylvania State Game Lands.

Course
Swanks Run begins on a plateau in Davidson Township. It flows east for several tenths of a mile, entering a small and narrow valley. It then receives an unnamed tributary from the left and turns southeast. Its valley becomes deeper as it flows downstream. After several tenths of a mile, the stream reaches its confluence with West Branch Fishing Creek.

Tributaries
Swanks Run  has no named tributaries. However, it does have one unnamed tributary, which is slightly less than half a mile long and flows in a north-to-south direction.

Hydrology, geography, and geology
The concentration of alkalinity in the waters of Swanks Run is one milligram per liter.

Swanks Run is on bedrock consisting of sandstone and shale for nearly its entire length. However, near the mouth of the stream, there is alluvium containing stratified silt, sand, and gravel, as well as some boulders. Additionally, a colluvium known as Boulder Colluvium occurs near the stream's mouth and also in the higher portions of the watershed, above the stream's valley. In these areas, the majority of the surface is covered in boulders and cobbles consisting of quartz, sandstone, or conglomerate.

Watershed
The stream is entirely within the United States Geological Survey quadrangle of Sonestown.

Swanks Run is on public and open land for its entire length. The stream is in the western part of Pennsylvania State Game Lands Number 13.

History
Swanks Run was entered into the Geographical Names Information System on August 2, 1979. Its identifier in the Geographical Names Information System is 1189137.

Biology
Swanks Run is considered by the Pennsylvania Fish and Boat Commission to be Class A Wild Trout Waters for brook trout. The stream holds this designation between its headwaters and its mouth. It is one of six streams to be designated as Class A Wild Trout Waters in Sullivan County.

See also
Slip Run (West Branch Fishing Creek), next tributary of West Branch Fishing Creek going downstream
List of tributaries of Fishing Creek (North Branch Susquehanna River)
List of rivers of Pennsylvania

References

Rivers of Sullivan County, Pennsylvania
Tributaries of Fishing Creek (North Branch Susquehanna River)
Rivers of Pennsylvania